Heer (army) may refer to:

 German Army, or Deutsches Heer (1956–present), for the Cold War Army of West Germany and the current Army of Germany
 German Army (1935–1945), or Heer, for the Second World War Army of Nazi Germany
 Reichswehr, or Reichsheer (1920–35), for the interwar Army of the Weimar Republic
 Imperial German Army, or Deutsches Heer (1871–1919), for Army of the German Empire
 Army of the Holy Roman Empire, or Reichsheer (1422–1806), for the army of the Holy Roman Empire
 Bundesheer or German Federal Army, the Army of the German Confederation (1815-1866)
 Österreichisches Bundesheer (1920–38, 1955–present), the current Austrian Armed Forces
 Heer, the current ground component of the Military of Switzerland

See also
 German Army (disambiguation)